Albert T. Poffenberger (1885–1977) was an American psychologist and a past president of the American Psychological Association (APA).

Growing up in Pennsylvania, Poffenberger graduated from Harrisburg High School and Bucknell University. He was on the faculty of Columbia University. He authored textbooks titled Psychology in Advertising and Applied Psychology: Its Principles and Methods. He was APA president in 1934.

References

1885 births
1977 deaths
Presidents of the American Psychological Association
Bucknell University alumni
Columbia University faculty
20th-century American psychologists